Sandro Gomes da Luz or simply Sandro Goiano (born August 6, 1973 in Pirenópolis), is a Brazilian defensive midfielder.

Attributes
Goiano was known for his strong defensive skills.

Honours
 Campeonato Goiano in 1990, 1991 and 1994 with Goiás
 Campeonato Paranaense in 1997 with Paraná
Campeonato Paraense in 2000, 2002, 2003 and 2005 with Paysandu
 Campeonato Brasileiro Série B in 2001 with Paysandu and 2005 with Grêmio
 Copa dos Campeões in 2002 with Paysandu
 Campeonato Gaúcho in 2006 with Grêmio
 Campeonato Pernambucano in 2008 with Sport Club do Recife
 Copa do Brasil in 2008 with Sport Club do Recife

External links
 Sport Club do Recife Official Site
 sambafoot
 CBF
 zerozero.pt
 globoesporte

1973 births
Living people
Brazilian footballers
Campeonato Brasileiro Série A players
Goiás Esporte Clube players
Sociedade Esportiva e Recreativa Caxias do Sul players
Tuna Luso Brasileira players
Paraná Clube players
Paysandu Sport Club players
Grêmio Foot-Ball Porto Alegrense players
Sport Club do Recife players
Association football midfielders